WarGames was a professional wrestling supercard event produced by Major League Wrestling (MLW). The event was named after the famous WarGames match, which has headlined the event. The event was produced by MLW in September twice, first as a supercard in 2003 and secondly as a television taping of MLW's television program Fusion in 2018. The 2018 WarGames match aired on the September 14, 2018 episode of Fusion on beIN Sports. It was replaced by War Chamber in 2019 after WWE acquired the rights from MLW to use the WarGames name for its NXT TakeOver events.

Dates and venues

References

External links
Major League Wrestling official website

Recurring events established in 2003
Recurring events disestablished in 2018
WarGames